Enyellé is a settlement in northern Republic of the Congo, in the middle of the continent of Africa.

External links

Populated places in the Republic of the Congo